Palden Tsering Gyamtso is an Indian politician from Sikkim.

He was elected to Upper House of India Parliament - the Rajya Sabha for the term 2000-2006 from Sikkim Democratic Front.

References

Rajya Sabha members from Sikkim
Sikkim Democratic Front politicians
Year of birth missing
Possibly living people